Leah Berard (born November 29, 1978) is a USA Rugby national panel referee. She currently serves as a referee in the PRO Rugby competition. She has refereed women's international rugby matches and worked as an assistant referee for men's international matches.

Early life

Berard was born in Woodruff, Wisconsin and moved to Stevens Point, WI when she was four years old. She lived there until she graduated from high school, going on to pursue a BA in both English and Spanish at the University of Wisconsin – La Crosse. She played rugby throughout college at inside center and was president of her university's club team her junior and senior years. During her time as an undergrad she also played for the WI U-23 select side team.

After college, Berard moved to Minneapolis and played with the Minnesota Valkyries Women's Rugby Team, but was forced to resign due to neck injuries. Leah stepped away from rugby for a few years to attend graduate school at the University of St. Thomas, getting an MA in English; it was only until after graduate school that Leah picked up the whistle and came back to rugby as a referee.

Career

Berard has steadily worked her way up through the ranks of the Midwest, achieving her Territorial Grade through refereeing Midwest Men’s Division 1 Rugby.

Berard is now focused on elevating herself within the international level. In December 2011, her first international appointment, she traveled to Port Elizabeth, South Africa to serve as an Assistant Referee for the IRB Sevens World Series. This successful appearance helped secure her a spot in the first IRB sanctioned Women's Sevens Challenge Cup in Hong Kong in March 2012. She also earned the opportunity to officiate the Cup Final – Australia vs. England.

Berard was named as an IRB Women’s Sevens Panel member in August 2013, her second season on the panel. She officiated the Women’s Rugby Sevens World Cup Final in Russia in June 2013.

In 2016, Berard was selected to referee matches in the newly-formed PRO Rugby competition.

References

1978 births
Living people
American rugby union referees
American female rugby union players
University of Wisconsin–La Crosse alumni
University of St. Thomas (Minnesota) alumni
Female rugby union referees
People from Woodruff, Wisconsin
American women referees and umpires
21st-century American women